South Beach is an unincorporated community in Lincoln County, Oregon, United States. South Beach has a post office with ZIP code 97366.

See also

 South Beach State Park

References

Unincorporated communities in Lincoln County, Oregon
Unincorporated communities in Oregon